Carlos Eugene Bernier Rodríguez (January 28, 1927 – April 6, 1989) was a Puerto Rican professional baseball player who played one full season as an outfielder in Major League Baseball for the  Pittsburgh Pirates.

Career

Bernier's professional career extended for 17 seasons (1948–1964). In addition to the 105 games he played for the 1953 Pirates, he appeared in an even 2,200 games in minor league baseball, with 1,725 games played at the highest levels (Triple-A and the Open Classification) then in existence. Bernier batted .298 with nearly 2,300 hits and exactly 200 home runs as a minor leaguer. In 1952, Bernier was named the PCL's Rookie of the Year by the Pacific Coast League Baseball Writers Association.

For the 1953 Pirates, Bernier collected 66 hits, including seven doubles, eight triples, and three home runs, in 310 at bats. On May 2, Bernier tied a modern major league record with three triples in  a game, becoming the 15th player to perform this feat in the post-Deadball era, and the first since Ben Chapman in 1939, as well the first National League player since Lance Richbourg in 1929.

In 1989, Bernier committed suicide by hanging.

See also
 List of Major League Baseball players from Puerto Rico

References

Further reading

Articles

 Cane, Paul (United Press). "Sack-Stealing Carlos Breaks Tie for Stars". The Madera Tribune. June 4, 1952. 
 UP. "Bernier Speeds to Top As PCL's Fastest Man". The Madera Tribune. July 24, 1952.
 UP. "Stars Tumbled 9-5 to Lose Ground to Oaks". The San Bernardino Sun. August 16, 1952.
 Cane, Paul (UP). "Base Larceny is Bernier's Career". The Madera Tribune. September 6, 1952.
 Biederman, Les. "The Scoreboard". The Pittsburgh Press. March 29, 1953.
 UP. "Major Record Tied: Bernier Hits 3 Triples". The San Bernardino Sun. May 3, 1953.
 Boyd, Jerry. "Boyd's Eye View". The San Bernardino Sun. May 5, 1964.
 UP. "Hardin, Bernier Bounced After Punch Exchange". The San Bernardino Sun. June 14, 1954.
 UP. "Bernier Handed Fine, Suspension". The San Bernardino Sun. June 15, 1954.
 UP. "Bernier Slugs Ump". The Madera Tribune. August 12, 1954.
 UP. "Bernier Banned". The San Bernardino Sun. August 13, 1954. 
 "Hits Umpire, Negro Coast Star Banned for Season". Jet. August 26, 1954.
 Bragan, Bobby. "Bragan Likes Fiery Bernier". The Plattsburgh Press-Republican. February 1, 1955.
 UP. "Bernier Returns Pact, Will Go to Pittsburgh". The San Bernardino Sun. March 4, 1955.
 UP. "Bernier Reports to Stars, Promises To Be 'Good Boy'". The San Bernardino Sun. March 26, 1955.
 Hayes, Peter (UP). "Seal Coach Hits Home Run As S. F. Defeats Oakland". The Madera Tribune. April 28, 1955.
 "A Light for Mother". Jet. May 26, 1955.
 UP. "Stars Edge Angels. 2 to 1; Padres Move Seven Ahead". The San Bernardino Sun. June 8, 1955.
 UP. "Hollywood Captures PCl Lead: Stars Trim L.A. As Seattle Falls". The San Bernardino Sun. September 2, 1955.
 "At the Training Camps". The Desert Sun. March 28, 1956.
 Associated Press. "Hollywood Sets New Coast League Record of 9 Steals". The Plattsburgh Press-Republican. April 24, 1956.
 UP. "Twinks Drop Two". The San Bernardino Sun. August 29, 1956.
 Bouchette, Ed. "No Black and White Answers to Question". The Pittsburgh Post-Gazette. May 15, 1987.
 Treder, Steve. "Carlos Bernier". Hardball Times. August 25, 2004.
 Guzzardi, Joe. "Carlos Bernier, more than a footnote". Pittsburgh Post-Gazette. April 14, 2013.
 Totti, Xavier F. "The Case for Carlos Bernier: Baseball's Historic Omission". Centro Voices. February 5, 2016.

Books
 Van Hyning, Thomas V. (1995) Puerto Rico's Winter League: A History of Major League Baseball's Launching Pad. Jefferson, NC: McFarland & Company. p. 120. .

External links

1927 births
1989 deaths
1989 suicides
Bristol Owls players
Broncos de Reynosa players
Columbus Jets players
Hawaii Islanders players
Hollywood Stars players
Indianapolis Indians players
Major League Baseball outfielders
Major League Baseball players from Puerto Rico
People from Juana Díaz, Puerto Rico
Pittsburgh Pirates players
Port Chester Clippers players
Puerto Rican expatriate baseball players in Mexico
Salt Lake City Bees players
St. Jean Braves players
Suicides by hanging in the United States
Suicides in Puerto Rico
Tampa Smokers players